Neil O'Halloran (21 June 1933 – October 1995) was a Welsh professional footballer who played as an inside forward.

Career
Born in Cardiff, O'Halloran played for Cardiff Corinthians, Cardiff City, Newport County and Barry Town.

References

1933 births
1995 deaths
Welsh footballers
Cardiff Corinthians F.C. players
Cardiff City F.C. players
Newport County A.F.C. players
Barry Town United F.C. players
English Football League players
Association football inside forwards